Kiener Plaza is a municipal park in downtown St. Louis, Missouri.

Description 
Originally developed in 1962, Kiener Plaza was given a major redesign and amenities update in 2017 as part of the CityArchRiver project. The park has a wide stone paved plaza and grassy lawns. Amenities include bicycle parking, benches, a playground, and a fountain with a splash pad.

The plaza is named for Harry Kiener, a local philanthropist and member of the U.S. track team at the 1904 Olympics held in St. Louis. In his will, Kiener left the city a bequest to build a fountain and athletic statue. Today, the focal point for the park is "The Olympic Runner" by Willam Zorach.

Because of its central location within downtown St. Louis, Kiener Plaza is host to public events including outdoor free movies and a winter festival.  It is often used as a rallying point for demonstrations and protest marches.

Geography 
Kiener Plaza is a section of the St. Louis Gateway Mall, located between Broadway and 7th Street. East on the mall is the Old Courthouse, associated with the Dred Scott case, now part of the Gateway Arch National Park.

Ballpark Village for the St. Louis Cardinals is a block south.

References 

Parks in St. Louis
1962 establishments in Missouri